Sylvester Wakoli Bifwoli (born 1952) is a Kenyan politician. He is a member of the Ford-Kenya political party, an affiliate of the Party of National Unity. He was elected to represent Bumula Constituency in Western Province, in the National Assembly of Kenya in the 2007 Kenyan parliamentary election. He also serves an Assistant Minister in the Ministry of Lands in Kenya's Grand Coalition Government.

Entry into Parliament

He was first elected into Parliament in 2002, succeeding Mr. Lawrence Sifuna. A career trade unionist and teacher, Wakoli has distinguished himself as a performer.

Wakoli Bifwoli, as he prefers to be referred, had stated his desire to run for Kenya's presidency in the 2012 national elections. He had vowed to legalize busaa, a traditional brew, if he did assume the presidency. He has also repeatedly called for Kenyans to desist from placing undue value on land.

References

External links

1952 births
Living people
Kenyan Luhya people
Forum for the Restoration of Democracy – Kenya politicians
Members of the National Assembly (Kenya)